Amandava is a genus  of the estrildid finches. These birds are found in dense grass or scrub in Africa and South Asia. They are gregarious seed-eaters with short, red bills. In earlier literature, amadavat and amidavad have been used. The name amandava, along with amadavat and amidavad are all corruptions of Ahmedabad, a city in Gujarat, India from where the first few specimens of the red munia Amandava amandava were obtained.

Taxonomy
The genus Amandava was introduced in 1836 by the English zoologist Edward Blyth for the red avadavat. The genus in mentioned in a footnote to a page of an edition of Gilbert White's The Natural History and Antiquities of Selborne that Blythe edited. The name is derived by tautomony with the binomial name Fringilla amandava introduced for the red avadavat by Carl Linnaeus in 1758. The word amandava is a corruption of Ahmedabad, a city in the Indian state of Gujarat. The genus Amandava is sister to the genus Amadiva containing two African finches.

Species
The genus contains three species:

The two avadavats, which are very closely related, are found in tropical South Asia, and the waxbill in Africa. Various members of this genus are sometimes placed in Sporaeginthus.

References

Clement, Harris and Davis, Finches and Sparrows

External links

 
Bird genera
Estrildidae
Waxbills
Taxa named by Edward Blyth